Lacy M. Johnson (born in 1978) is an American writer, professor and activist. She is the author of Trespasses: A Memoir (University of Iowa Press, 2012), The Other Side: A Memoir (Tin House, 2014) and The Reckonings: Essays (Scribner, 2018).

Early life and education
Johnson was born in Iowa. She grew up in rural Missouri, in a town called Macon, Missouri, which was featured in her 2012 book, Trespasses: A Memoir.

In 2002, Johnson received a B.A. from the University of Missouri. In 2004, she received an M.A. from the University of Kansas. In 2008, Johnson earned a Ph.D. from University of Houston’s Creative Writing Program. Her thesis was called I, Mongrel.

Career
Johnson has written two memoirs, 2012's Trespasses: A Memoir and 2014's The Other Side: A Memoir. In both memoirs, Johnson tells readers about when her ex-boyfriend kidnapped, raped, and held her hostage in 2000. The books do not focus on the violence, but rather on how Johnson is reclaiming her story and learning how to cope with her trauma. After her second book, The Other Side was published, Johnson was repeatedly asked the question, "What would she like to see happen to her rapist."

This question began Johnson's investigation into the concepts of forgiveness and mercy in her 2018 book, The Reckonings: Essays, where to many audience members' surprise, Johnson does not want vengeance, and frequently says that her idea of justice is to have her rapist be held accountable and for her to heal. Johnson's rapist was never brought to trial after he fled arrest and now lives in Venezuela.

The Other Side: A Memoir was named One of The Best Books of 2014 by Kirkus Reviews and was a finalist for the Council of Literary Magazines and Presses Firecracker Award in Nonfiction, the Dayton Literary Peace Prize the National Book Critics Circle Award and the Edgar Award in Best Fact Crime.

The Reckonings: Essays, was a finalist in the Criticism category of the National Book Critics Circle Award.

Johnson has said that her formal training was in poetry, which was one of the structures she used in the often short pieces in her first book, Trespasses: A Memoir.

Johnson teaches at Rice University in creative nonfiction.

Johnson is the founding director of the Houston Flood Museum.

Personal life
Johnson is married and has children. She lives in Houston.

Selected honors
 2020: John Simon Guggenheim Memorial Foundation, Guggenheim Fellowship, Creative Arts, General Nonfiction

Selected works and publications

Selected works

Selected publications

References

External links
 
 
 Lacy M. Johnson at Rice University

Writers from Houston
21st-century American women writers
Living people
University of Houston alumni
University of Houston faculty
Rice University faculty
21st-century American memoirists
American women memoirists
American women academics
1978 births
People from Iowa
University of Kansas alumni
University of Missouri alumni